Ormançayı is a village in the Çüngüş District of Diyarbakır Province in Turkey.

References

Villages in Çüngüş District